The IP Extension metro station is located on the Pink Line of the Delhi Metro.

History
As part of Phase III of Delhi Metro, IP Extension is the metro station of the Pink Line became operational on 31 October 2018.

Station

Station layout

Track layout

Exits

Connections
This station is directly connected to  Vinod  Nagar Depot by  elevated feeder lines passing over Delhi Meerut Expressway.

See also

Delhi
List of Delhi Metro stations
Transport in Delhi
Delhi Metro Rail Corporation
Delhi Suburban Railway
Delhi Monorail
Sanjay Lake
Mayur Vihar
Delhi Transport Corporation
East Delhi
New Delhi
National Capital Region (India)
List of rapid transit systems
List of metro systems

References

External links

 Delhi Metro Rail Corporation Ltd. (Official site)
 Delhi Metro Annual Reports
 
 UrbanRail.Net – descriptions of all metro systems in the world, each with a schematic map showing all stations.

Delhi Metro stations
Railway stations in East Delhi district